Karol Schayer (25 December 1900 in Lwów – 15 March 1971 in Rockford, Illinois) was a Polish architect and soldier. He designed buildings in Katowice, Warsaw, and (during and after World War II) in Beirut, Lebanon.

Schayer immigrated to Lebanon during World War II where he collaborated with Fritz Gothelf, a German architect educated in the spirit of the Bauhaus, and Bahij Makdissi, a Lebanese structural engineer.

Major buildings and projects 

 1929 - school, Lubliniec
 1930 - apartment building on Dąbrowskiego 24 / W. Reymonta 6, Katowice
 1932 - school on ul. Farna in Chorzów (with Antoni Olszewski)
 1934 - Muzeum Śląskie building, Chrobrego square (demolished in 1941)
 1936 - Żytomierski House, PCK street, Katowice
 1936 - Międzynarodowy Bank Handlowy, Mielęckiego street, Katowice
 1937 - Radowski House, Korfantego street, Katowice
 1937 - Chmielewski House, Frascati 4 street, Warsaw
 1952 - AUB Alumni Club building, Beirut (1952)
 1954 - Dar Al Sayad, Beirut (1954)
 1955 - Hotel Carlton, Raouche, Beirut (demolished)
 1958 - Horeshoe Building, Hamra street, Beirut
 1959 - Shell Building, Beirut

See also
Architecture of Lebanon

Bibliography 
 Arbid, George (2012), Karol Schayer, Architect (1900 - 1971): A Pole in Beirut, Basel, Birkhauser Verlag,

References 

1900 births
1971 deaths
Lviv Polytechnic alumni
20th-century Polish architects
Polish emigrants to Lebanon